Richard William Robert Shortt (22 March 1922 – 17 August 1994) was a New Zealand cricket umpire. He stood in nine Test matches between 1959 and 1973.

References

1922 births
1994 deaths
New Zealand Test cricket umpires
English emigrants to New Zealand